Brunella Gasperini, pen name of Bianca Robecchi (Milan, 22 December 1918 – Milan, 7 January 1979) was an Italian journalist and novelist.

Biography
She spent most of her life between Milan, her birthplace, and San Mamete, a small hamlet in Valsolda, on Lake Lugano.

After a short experience as a teacher in the immediate post-war period, she started writing for the newspaper Il Corriere della Sera and many Rizzoli magazines  in the early 1950s, distinguishing herself for her modern and progressive point of view on the problems that would dominate Italian society in the following years. Her column Ditelo a Brunella ("Tell Brunella"), where she established a direct and frank dialogue with her readers on such themes as divorce, abortion, family and politics, appeared on Annabella for twenty-five years. She dealt with similar issues in her column Lettere a Candida ("Letters to Candida"), in the magazine Novella.

In 1956 she published her first novel, L'estate dei bisbigli (previously issued in instalments in Annabella), followed by Io e loro: cronache di un marito (1959), Rosso di sera (1964), A scuola si muore (1975) and Grazie lo stesso, all published by Rizzoli. Her non-fiction work includes the humouristic handbook manual Il galateo di Brunella Gasperini (Sonzogno, 1975) and her autobiography Una donna e altri animali (Rizzoli, 1978).

A selection of her editorials and of the letters published in Annabella was collected posthumously in Così la penso io (Rizzoli, 1979) and Più botte che risposte (Rizzoli, 1981).

Her books have been translated and successfully published into several languages, such as German, French, Spanish, Hungarian.
From her marriage to Adelmo Gasperini (called Mino by everyone and “life mate” by Brunella) she had two children, Massimo (1946-2013), a sculptor, and Nicoletta (1950-1989), herself a journalist, who wrote assiduously for different fashion and music magazines.

Bibliography

Fiction

1956 L'estate dei bisbigli, Rizzoli
1957 Le vie del vento, Rizzoli
1957 Fanali gialli, Rizzoli   
1958 Le note blu, Rizzoli    
1958 Le ragazze della villa accanto, Rizzoli     
1959 Io e loro: cronache di un marito, Rizzoli
1960 Ero io quella, Rizzoli
1961 Lui e noi: cronache di una moglie, Rizzoli 
1964 Rosso di sera, Rizzoli
1965 Noi e loro: cronache di una figlia, Rizzoli
1970 I fantasmi nel cassetto, Edizioni di Novissima
1973 Luna straniera, AMZ
1974 Siamo in famiglia, Rizzoli
1975 A scuola si muore, Rizzoli
1975 Il buio alle spalle, AMZ
1976 Grazie lo stesso, Rizzoli
1976 Storie d'amore storie d'allegria (short stories), Rizzoli
1978 Una donna e altri animali, Rizzoli

Other

1957 Dopo di lei, signora, Rizzoli
1958 Cos'è una donna: problemi e segreti delle adolescenti, Marietti
1960 Sposarsi è facile ma..., Rizzoli  
1975 I problemi sessuali e psicologici dell'adolescenza, AMZ
1975 I problemi sessuali e psicologici prima del matrimonio, AMZ
1975 Cos'è conoscersi: problemi e rapporti col tuo ragazzo, Marietti
1975 Il galateo di Brunella Gasperini, Sonzogno
1976 I problemi sessuali e psicologici della coppia, AMZ
1976 Di chi è la colpa: capire e risolvere i problemi del matrimonio, Marietti
1979 Così la penso io, Rizzoli
1981 Più botte che risposte (collection of letters to Annabella), Rizzoli

References

External links
  Fans Page (Italian)
 Page in English 

1918 births
1979 deaths
Italian women novelists
Italian women journalists
Journalists from Milan
20th-century Italian women writers
20th-century Italian novelists
Pseudonymous women writers
Italian feminists
20th-century Italian translators
Writers from Milan
20th-century pseudonymous writers